Skalice is a municipality and village in Tábor District in the South Bohemian Region of the Czech Republic. It has about 500 inhabitants.

Administrative parts
Villages of Radimov, Rybova Lhota and Třebiště are administrative parts of Skalice.

References

Villages in Tábor District